Pope Innocent VI (1282 or 1295 – 12 September 1362), born Étienne Aubert, was head of the Catholic Church and ruler of the Papal States from 18 December 1352 to his death in September 1362. He was the fifth Avignon pope and the only one with the pontifical name of "Innocent".

Early life
Étienne's father was Adhemar Aubert (1260-?), seigneur de Montel-de-Gelat in Limousin province. He was a native of the hamlet of Les Monts, Diocese of Limoges (today part of the commune of Beyssac, département of Corrèze), and, after having taught civil law at Toulouse, he became successively Bishop of Noyon in 1338 and Bishop of Clermont in 1340. On 20 September 1342, he was raised to the position of Cardinal Priest of SS. John and Paul. He was made cardinal-bishop of Ostia and Velletri on 13 February 1352, by Pope Clement VI, whom he succeeded.

His papacy
Etienne was crowned pope on 30 December 1352 by Cardinal Gaillard de la Mothe after the papal conclave of 1352. Upon his election, he revoked a signed agreement stating the college of cardinals was superior to the pope. His subsequent policy compares favourably with that of the other Avignon Popes. He introduced many needed reforms in the administration of church affairs, and through his legate, Cardinal Albornoz, who was accompanied by Rienzi, he sought to restore order in Rome. In 1355, Charles IV, Holy Roman Emperor, was crowned in Rome with Innocent's permission, after having made an oath that he would quit the city on the day of the ceremony.

It was largely through the exertions of Innocent VI that the Treaty of Brétigny (1360) between France and England was brought about. During his pontificate, the Byzantine emperor John V Palaeologus offered to submit the Greek Orthodox Church to the Roman See in return for assistance against John VI Cantacuzenus. The resources at the disposal of the Pope, however, were all required for exigencies nearer home, and the offer was declined.

Most of the wealth accumulated by John XXII and Benedict XII had been lost during the extravagant pontificate of Clement VI. Innocent VI economised by cutting the chapel staff (capellani capelle) from twelve to eight. Works of art were sold rather than commissioned. His pontificate was dominated by the war in Italy and by Avignon's recovery from the plague, both of which made draining demands on his treasury. By 1357, he was complaining of poverty.

Innocent VI was a liberal patron of letters. If the extreme severity of his measures against the Fraticelli is ignored, he retains a high reputation for justice and mercy. However, St. Bridget of Sweden denounced him as a persecutor of Christians. He died on 12 September 1362 and was succeeded by Urban V. Today, his tomb can be found in the Chartreuse du Val de Bénédiction, the Carthusian monastery in Villeneuve-lès-Avignon.

See also

List of popes

Notes

References
Modified text from the 9th edition (1879) of an unnamed encyclopedia
Tomasello, Music and Ritual at Papal Avignon 1309–1403. Ann Arbor, Michigan: UMI Research Press, 1983.
Louis XI (king of France),Josepf Frederic, Louis Vaesen,Etienne Charavay,Bernard Edouard de Mandrot-1905.(Googles livres)
Societe' d'etudes de la province de Cambrai,Lille-1907
Antoine Pellisier (1961). Innocent VI :le reformateur, deuxième pape Limousin (1352–1362) 

 
 

1282 births
1362 deaths
People from Corrèze
Popes
French popes
Cardinal-bishops of Ostia
Bishops of Noyon
Bishops of Clermont
Avignon Papacy
House of Aubert
14th-century French Roman Catholic bishops
Major Penitentiaries of the Apostolic Penitentiary
14th-century popes
14th-century peers of France